Norah Gurdon (Jan-March 1882 - 27 June 1974) was an Australian artist. Her first name is often misspelled Nora in many articles reviewing her work.

Early life 
Norah Gurdon was born around Jan-March 1882 in Norfolk, England, to Dr. Edwin John Gurdon and Ellen Ann Randall. She was baptised on 11 April 1882. She was the second of four surviving children, and her family emigrated to Ballarat, Victoria in 1886, travelling on board ship the Carlisle Castle. They eventually settled in Brighton where her father had a doctor's surgery at their home. Gurdon showed early artistic talent while attending Brighton High School for Girls.

Career 
Gurdon attended the National Gallery School from 1901 to 1908, being taught by noted artists Frederick McCubbin and Bernard Hall. While there she studied with fellow artists Jessie Traill, Dora Wilson, Constance Jenkins, and Janet Cumbrae Stewart, who were to become her lifelong friends. An accomplished landscape and still-life painter, Gurdon exhibited her works with the Victorian Artists Society while still a student. She established her artistic prowess early on by winning the major category for oil painting in the 1909 City of Prahran's Art Exhibition Prize. By the following year she had rented a studio in Collins Street along with friends Stewart and Traill. As well as being a prominent figure in the Melbourne Society of Painters and Sculptors, Gurdon went on to exhibit with fellow National Gallery School alumni in 1913 as part of Twelve Melbourne Painters. The group included Ruth Sutherland, Charles Wheeler, Dora Wilson, May Roxburgh, Percy Leason, Louis McCubbin, Penleigh Boyd, H.B. Harrison, and Frank Cozier.

World War I 
Intending to continue her artistic training overseas, in 1914 Gurdon travelled to England with her sister Winifred. Gurdon along with friend Jessie Traill was stuck in Europe due to the outbreak of war ten weeks after arriving. She signed up as a British Red Cross volunteer nurse in a French military hospital at Le Croisic, serving for three and a half years and was awarded a British Victory medal for her services. Much of her painting during this time was landscapes from travels to England and Scotland prior to war breaking out, and when armistice was reached in 1920 she stayed on to paint through Scotland, Suffolk, and Cornwall. This was hardly her only venture overseas however, as she returned in 1927, meeting fellow artists Pegg Clarke and Dora Wilson in Rome, and narrowly avoiding World War II on her 1938 travels to Norway and Sweden.

Kalorama 
Unlike many other female artists of the time, Norah Gurdon was unmarried and financially independent. She purchased land in 1922 with plans to build her dream house in the Dandenong Ranges at Kalorama. When the house was finished she lived there with her sister Winifred and had many fellow artists as guests, with former students and teachers joining her for plen air landscape painting. While Gurdon painted in an impressionist style similar to her contemporaries, she favoured muted blue and grey tones to capture the hills of the Dandenongs. She also enjoyed handicrafts, spending her spare time at tapestry looms designing and producing her own floor rugs and mats.

Exhibitions 
Gurdon was a regular and successful exhibitor of work, exhibiting with the Victorian Artists Society, Melbourne Society of Women Painters and Sculptors, and the Australian Art Association. In the 1920s she held many solo exhibitions at the Athenaeum Gallery, and later at the Women's Industrial Arts Society in Sydney, and the Royal Queensland Art Society in Brisbane. She held an exhibition in 1937 at the Fine Arts Gallery in aid of the construction of St George's Hospital in Kew.
1909
 The Waddy Club, Guildhall, Melbourne, June 1909
1910
 Victorian Artists' Society, Athenaeum Art Gallery, Melbourne, October 1910
1911
 City of Prahran Art Exhibition (First Prize in Oils for the work "Tottie"), September 1911
1912
 Group exhibition (with Dora Wilson and Ruth Sutherland), Tuckett and Styles' Art Gallery, Melbourne, 7 - 18 May 1912
 Victorian Artists' Society Autumn Exhibition, Albert St Galleries, Eastern Hill, Melbourne, 16 - 30 April 1912
 Victorian Artists' Society annual exhibition, Albert St Galleries, Eastern Hill, Melbourne, July 1912
1913
 Twelve Melbourne Painters, Athenaeum Gallery, Melbourne, September 1913
 Victorian Artists Society annual exhibition, Albert St Galleries, Eastern Hill, Melbourne, September 1913
1915
 Private viewing at studio, 404 Fulham Road, London, July 1915
1920
 Solo exhibition, Athenaeum Gallery, Melbourne, 18 - 28 May 1920
 Society of Women Painters, Queen Victoria Building, Sydney, August 1920
1921
 Solo exhibition, Queensland Art Society's Gallery, Kent Building, Brisbane, April 1921 
 Miss Margaret McLean Studio, Melbourne, April 1921
 Victorian Artists' Society Autumn Exhibition, Albert St Galleries, Eastern Hill, Melbourne, 1921
 Victorian Artists' Society Spring Exhibition, Albert St Galleries, Eastern Hill, Melbourne, 1921
1922
 The Gordon Art Club, Stanley Davidson Memorial Gall, Gordon Institute, Geelong, 27 July - 8 August 1922
 Victorian Artists Society Spring Exhibition, Albert St Galleries, Eastern Hill, Melbourne, 1922
1923
 Solo exhibition, Athenaeum Gallery, Melbourne, 10 - 23 April 1923
 Melbourne Society of Women Painters and Sculptors Annual exhibition, May 1923
 Australian Pictures for London Exhibition, Education Building, Sydney, June 1923
 Women's Art Club, Athenaeum Gallery, Melbourne, August 1923
 Queensland Art Society, Brisbane, November 1923
 Royal Academy Exhibition of Australian Art, London, 1923
 Empire Exhibition, Australian Court of the Fine Art Palace, London, December 1923
1924
 Society of Women Painters Annual Exhibition, Education Department Gallery, Sydney, May 1924
 Women's Art Club, Athenaeum Gallery, Melbourne, 1 - 11 October 1924
1925
 Miss Margaret McLean Studio, Melbourne, 26 March - 8 April 1925
 Solo exhibition, Athenaeum Gallery, Melbourne, 20- 30 May 1925 
 Women's Art Club, Athenaeum Gallery, Melbourne, June 1925
 Sedon Galleries, Hardware Chambers, Melbourne, October 1925
 Exhibition of oils and watercolours, Sedon Galleries, Melbourne, 14 -18 December 1925
1926
 Society of Women Painters, Education Department Galleries, Sydney, April 1926
 Fundraising exhibition for the Children's Hospital, Fine Art Society's Gallery, Melbourne, July 1926
 Works in oil and watercolour by Australian Artists, New Gallery, Melbourne, 6 - 20 July 1926 
 Arts and Crafts Society Annual Exhibition, Society's Rooms, Melbourne, (Exhibited a bag, hat and baskets) 21 September - 16 October 1926 
 Melbourne Society of Women Painters and Sculptors annual exhibition, October 1926
 Women's Art Club, Athenaeum Gallery, Melbourne, 1 - 11 December 1926
1927
 Solo exhibition, Athenaeum Gallery, 28 April - 7 May 1927
 Collection of Mr E.H. Serle's Pictures, Victorian Artists' Society, Albert St Galleries, Eastern Hill, Melbourne, May 1927
 Miss Margret MacLean Gallery, Cornhill Building, Melbourne, September 1927
 The Arts and Craft Society of Victoria, (First Prize for Best Raffin Bag (joint winner)), Melbourne, September 1927
 Victorian Artists' Society Spring Exhibition, Albert St Galleries, Eastern Hill, Melbourne, October 1927
1928
Women's Art Club Annual Exhibition, Athenaeum Gallery, Melbourne, October 1928
1929
Australian Painters, New Gallery, Melbourne, 12 - 26 March 1929
"Record of a short tour abroad", Solo exhibition, New Gallery, Melbourne, 9 - 20 April 1929
Arts and Crafts Society of Victoria, Melbourne Town Hall, Melbourne, 1 - 12 October 1929
Victorian Artists' Society Spring Exhibition, Albert St Galleries, Eastern Hill, Melbourne, October 1929
Women's Art Club Annual Exhibition, Athenaeum Gallery, Melbourne, October 1929
1930
War artists exhibition, Sedon Galleries, Melbourne, May 1930
Society of Women Painters, Education Department Galleries, Sydney, May 1930 
The Cheyne Gallery, Melbourne, June 1930
Victorian Artists' Society exhibition, Albert St Galleries, Eastern Hill, Melbourne, October 1930
1931
Victorian Artists' Society exhibition, Albert St Galleries, Eastern Hill, Melbourne, April 1931
Society of Women Painters, Athenaeum Gallery, Melbourne, September 1931
1932
Hand weaving exhibition, Arts and Crafts Society of Victoria Rooms, Little Collins Street, (Exhibited woolen rugs) 29 January - 5 February 1932
Exhibition of Paintings and Miniatures, Athenaeum Gallery, Melbourne, 3 - 23 July 1932 
Victorian Artists' Society Spring Exhibition, Albert St Galleries, Eastern Hill, Melbourne, 26 September - 9 October 1932
1933
South Australian Society of Arts Spring Exhibition, Society's Gallery, North Terrace, Adelaide, 21 September - 12 October 1933
Melbourne Society of Women Painters Annual Exhibition, Athenaeum Gallery, 10 - 24 October 1933
Arts and Crafts Society of Victoria, Melbourne, October 1933
1934
Victorian Artists' Society Autumn Exhibition, Albert St Galleries, Eastern Hill, Melbourne, 1 - 13 May 1934
Society of Women Painters Annual Exhibition, Education Department Gallery, Sydney, May 1934
Society of Women Painters Exhibition, Education Department Gallery, Sydney, July 1934 
Arts and Crafts Society Annual Exhibition, Lower Melbourne Town Hall, 19 - 29 September 1934
Victorian Artists' Society Spring Exhibition, Albert St Galleries, Eastern Hill, Melbourne, October 1934
Melbourne Society of Women Painters, 16 - 27 October 1934
Melbourne Society of Women Painters, Athenaeum Gallery, October 1934
Solo exhibition, Kalorama studio at home, 24 November - 2 December 1934
1935
Victorian Artists' Society Spring Exhibition, Albert St Galleries, Eastern Hill, Melbourne, 26 April - 10 May 1935
1936
Paintings by Australian Artists, Stair Gallery, Melbourne, 25 February - 11 March 1936
Women's Industrial Arts Society Exhibition, Victoria Arcade, Sydney, May 1936
Society of Twenty Melbourne Painters Annual Exhibition, Athenaeum Hall, Melbourne, September 1936
Melbourne Society of Women Painters Annual Exhibition, Athenaeum Gallery, Melbourne, October 1936
Arts and Crafts Society of Victoria, Lower Melbourne Town Hall, (Exhibited woven bags and belts), October 1936
1937
Arts and Crafts Society of Victoria, Collins Street, Melbourne, (Exhibited tapestry, woven bags and a woven hen) February 1937
Solo Fundraising exhibition for St George's Hospital Building League, Fine Art Society's Gallery, Melbourne, 6 - 17 April 1937
Arts and Crafts Society of Victoria Annual Exhibition, Lower Melbourne Town Hall, (Exhibited a tapestry cushion) September 1937
Melbourne Society of Women Painters Annual Exhibition, Athenaeum Gallery, Melbourne, 5 - 16 October 1937
1939
Fundraising exhibition for the Bush Fire Relief Fund, Athenaeum Gallery, Melbourne, February 1939
Hawthorn Municipal Library, July - 5 August 1939
Melbourne Society of Women Painters Annual Exhibition, Athenaeum Gallery, Melbourne, 3 - 14 October 1939
1940
Melbourne Society of Women Painters Annual Exhibition, Athenaeum Gallery, Melbourne, 15 - 26 October 1940
Fundraising exhibition for the Lord Mayor's Patriotic Appeal, Sedon Gallery, Melbourne, November 1940
1941
Melbourne Society of Women Painters Annual Exhibition, Athenaeum Gallery, Melbourne, 21October - 1 November 1941
1942
Melbourne Society of Women Painters Annual Exhibition, Athenaeum Gallery, October 1942
1943
Solo Fundraising exhibition for Red Cross Prisoners of War Fund, Sedon Gallery, Melbourne, 24 March - 4 April 1943
1944
6th Annual Australian Academy of Art (Southern division), Melbourne, July 1944
The Blue Door, Melbourne, July 1944
The Blue Door, Melbourne, November 1944
1945
The Blue Door, Melbourne, February 1945
1946
Spring Collection of Pictures, The Blue Door, Melbourne, September 1946 
Melbourne Society of Women Painters Annual Exhibition, Athenaeum Gallery, Melbourne, 15 - 25 October 1946 
1949
Dandenong Ranges Group Handicrafts Exhibition, Shire Hall, Ferntree Gully, (Exhibited floor rugs and weavings), June 1949 
Solo Fundraising exhibition for "the Food for Britain Fund' and the "Church of England Diocesan Homes for Elderly People," Sedon Gallery, Melbourne, August 1949
Christmas Show, Sedon Gallery, Melbourne, December 1949
1950
Paintings by Past and Present Australian Artists, Sedon Galleries, June 1950
1953

 "Herald outdoor art show 1953", Treasury Gardens, Melbourne, 12 - 20 December 1953

1977

 "Project 21: Women's Images of Women", Art Gallery of New South Wales, Sydney, 15 October - 13 November 1977

1995

 "The Women's View: Australian women artists in the Bendigo Art Gallery, 1888-1995", Bendigo Art Gallery, Bendigo, 8 March - 2 April 1995
 "A l'hombre des jeunes filles et des fleurs: In the shadow of young girls and flowers", Benalla Art Gallery, Benalla, 10 March - 28 May 1995

2021
"Her Own Path", Bayside Gallery, Melbourne, 13 March - 19 May 2021
"Trailblazers: Women of the Yarra Ranges", Yarra Ranges Regional Museum, 6 March - 26 July 2021

Collections 
Norah Gurdon's work is held in the collections of Shepparton Art Museum, Yarra Ranges Regional Museum, Castlemaine Art Gallery, National Gallery of Victoria, Bendigo Art Gallery, Benalla Art Gallery, Brighton Historical Society.

Further reading 
Her Own Path: Norah Gurdon, Bayside City Council

Norah Gurdon [Australian art and artists file], State Library Victoria

References 

Australian portrait painters
20th-century Australian painters
1882 births
1974 deaths
Australian women painters
English emigrants to colonial Australia
People from Brighton, Victoria
Artists from Melbourne
National Gallery of Victoria Art School alumni